Sielce  is a village in the administrative district of Gmina Sanniki, within Gostynin County, Masovian Voivodeship, in east-central Poland.

The village has a population of 360.

References

Sielce